The Miracle on Grass was an Australian Football League match in Round 13 of the 2013 AFL season, between the Brisbane Lions and the Geelong Cats. In the match, the Lions came back from a 52-point deficit during the third quarter to clinch a 5-point win with a goal after the siren. The win was the eighth-biggest comeback in VFL/AFL history, and the largest in the history of the Brisbane Lions. The game was given its name by commentator Anthony Hudson.

Background
Prior to the game, Geelong was in second place on the ladder, with 10 wins and one loss. By contrast, Brisbane was in the bottom four with only 3 wins. The game was the 200th of Brisbane veteran Ash McGrath, and the game in which Brisbane player Simon Black broke the club record for most games played, with his 320th game. Coming into the match, Geelong was heavy favourite to win.

The game

First three quarters
Geelong kicked the first two goals of the game, and while Brisbane managed to gain the lead early, by half-time Geelong had a 27-point lead. This lead only widened, and late in the third quarter, with Brisbane down 52 points, they looked certain to go down in defeat. However, Brisbane managed to kick two goals late in the quarter, lowering the lead to 38 points.

Voss' speech
At three-quarter time, Brisbane coach Michael Voss gave a speech to the Brisbane players, wherein he encouraged the players to follow the game plan he had devised, and told them that they still had a chance of winning. The speech was credited by McGrath for the Lions' victory.

Final quarter
Early in the fourth quarter, Geelong players Steve Johnson and Steven Motlop both missed shots on goal, widening the margin to 40 points. Soon after, Johnson was attempting to move the ball up the ground for another attempt on goal, but when he kicked the ball it bounced off an umpire, and, in the ensuing passage of play, Brisbane player Dayne Zorko managed to score a goal, lowering the margin to 34 points. Brisbane players Brent Moloney and Jed Adcock both kicked goals afterwards, lowering the margin to 20 points. Johnson then managed to kick a goal for Geelong, raising the margin to 26 points, it would however, be their last goal for the match. Goals for Brisbane to Pearce Hanley, Moloney and Mitch Golby lowered the margin to 7 points, and a behind to Jonathan Brown lowered the margin to a goal. Then, with just over a minute and a half on the clock Daniel Rich scored, a goal, leveling the score. However, star Geelong forward Tom Hawkins then managed to score a behind. The ball was rushed towards the Brisbane goal, but Geelong player Josh Hunt took an intercept mark and the ball moved towards Geelong's goal, where Brisbane's Daniel Merrett managed to take a mark. With only 15 seconds left to play it seemed that Geelong would win by a point. However, in those 15 seconds, Brisbane managed to move the ball across the ground, and McGrath took a mark a second before the siren sounded. McGrath proceeded to kick a goal after the siren, winning the game for Brisbane.

Aftermath
Voss stated after the match that he hoped the victory would improve Brisbane's performance for the rest of the season. His position as coach had been considered to be in danger coming into the match, and the stunning victory was viewed as having potentially saved his career. Voss was sacked later that year, after many Brisbane players had threatened to refuse to play if his contract was renewed. Brisbane did not defeat Geelong again until 2019.

In popular culture
The "Miracle on Grass" is an achievement in AFL Evolution 2, achieved by winning after overcoming a 52-point deficit. The game was used in the promotional video for the launch of the 2021 AFL season.

See also
2013 AFL season
Essendon v Kangaroos (2001 AFL season)

References

2013 in Australian rules football
Brisbane Lions
Geelong Football Club
Australian Football League games
Nicknamed sporting events
2013 Australian Football League season